Mario Almario (born 18 July 1934) is a sailor from Philippines. Almario represented his country at the 1972 Summer Olympics in Kiel. Almario took 26th place in the Soling with Alfonso Qua and Ambrosio Santos as fellow crew members. Almario also represented his country at the 1976 Summer Olympics in Kingston, Ontario were he took 28th place in the Finn. His last Olympic appearance was during the 1992 Summer Olympics in Barcelona in the Soling with Juan Miguel Torres and Teodorico Asejo as fellow crew members. The team took the 24th place.

References

External links
 

1934 births
Living people
Filipino male sailors (sport)
Sailors at the 1972 Summer Olympics – Soling
Sailors at the 1976 Summer Olympics – Finn
Sailors at the 1992 Summer Olympics – Soling
Olympic sailors of the Philippines